Singh Khalsa is a town located in the Punjab province of Pakistan. It is located in Lahore District at 31°14'0N 73°10'0E with an altitude of 172 metres (567 feet) and lies near to the city of Lahore.

References

Populated places in Lahore District